Waikato County was one of the counties of New Zealand on the North Island. Under the Local Government (Waikato Region) Reorganisation Order of 1989, nearly all of the county was added to the boroughs of Huntly, Ngāruawāhia, most of Raglan County Council, and a small part of Waipa County Council, to form Waikato District Council.

The council first met on 9 January 1877 at the Court House in Cambridge.

The former County Council office at 455 Grey Street in Hamilton East opened in 1910. It has not been greatly altered and is now used by a travel agent. It is protected by a Category B listing in Hamilton City's District Plan. It was replaced by new offices to the rear of it, which had a foundation stone dated 4 February 1971 and were first used for a meeting on 21 March 1972. The old building was leased to the Ministry of Agriculture. After 1989 the new building was used by Waikato District Council and then by Hill Laboratories until 2017. Since 2020 it has been renovated as Hills Village apartments.

See also
 List of former territorial authorities in New Zealand § Counties

References

Counties of New Zealand
Politics of Waikato

External links 

 1907 map – north of the county – Taupiri to Maramarua
south of the county – Cambridge to Taupiri